William Wiles Elder (July 31, 1885 – March 7, 1960) was an American football coach.  He served as the head football coach at Rensselaer Polytechnic Institute (RPI) in 1907 and at Williams College in 1908, compiling a career college football coaching record of 7–6–2.  Elder graduated from Phillips Exeter Academy in 1904 and from Williams College in 1908.  He died on March 7, 1960, in Gladstone, New Jersey.

Head coaching record

References

1885 births
1960 deaths
American football ends
RPI Engineers football coaches
Williams Ephs football coaches
Williams Ephs football players
Phillips Exeter Academy alumni
Sportspeople from Richmond, Indiana